The Indian XXI Corps was an Army Corps of the Indian Army during the Second World War. It served in the Tenth Army in 1942.

Formation
Lieutenant-General Mosley Mayne

 8th Indian Infantry Division, Major-General Charles Harvey
 10th Indian Infantry Division, Major-General Alan Blaxland
 6th Indian Infantry Division commanded by Major-General J.N. Thomson
 31st Indian Armoured Division, Major-General Robert Wordsworth
 10th Indian Motor Brigade, Brigadier Harold Redman

Notes

Corps of India in World War II
Corps of British India
Military units and formations established in 1942
1942 establishments in India
Military units and formations of the British Empire in World War II